Kris Kalifatidis (born 3 January 1958) is an Australian former soccer player who played as a defender. He made one appearance for the Australia national team.

Club career
Kalifatidis played his junior football for South Melbourne before playing ten seasons for the club, Kris played in the state league from 1974 to 1976 and then played the National Soccer League in 1977 to 1984. Kris was a part of the winning 1984 South Melbourne side who won their first national league title. Kris also scored the winning goal from a Jimmy Mackay corner in the final minutes of the Australia cup in 1976 with a spectacular volley from the 18 yard box into the top right hand corner of the net, South Melbourne beat St George of Sydney 2–1.

International career
Kalifatidis played one match for the Australia national team against Greece in Melbourne and was best on ground performance.

References

Living people
1958 births
Australian people of Greek descent
Australian soccer players
Association football defenders
Australia international soccer players
South Melbourne FC players